Desmond Nethersole-Thompson (1908–1989) was a British teacher, ornithologist and writer.  Of Irish stock, Nethersole-Thompson was brought up in the south of England, and educated at St Paul's School, London and the London School of Economics . From the 1930s he spent most of his life in Scotland and is notable for his contribution to ornithology through his monographs on various birds of the Scottish Highlands, as well as his other writings. He was one of a generation of country-lovers who transferred their field craft from stalking, hunting and collecting to observing the previously unstudied behaviours of wild animals.

Together with his second wife, Maimie (1930–2015), Nethersole-Thompson raised six children: Bruin, Patrick, Richard, Maimie, Eamonn and Katherine, all of whom grew up involved in the family wader research.

Nethersole-Thompson stood as a parliamentary candidate for the Labour Party in Inverness at the 1950 and 1955 general elections. He was also an elected member of Inverness County Council.

In 1981, Nethersole-Thompson was awarded the Neill Prize by the Royal Society of Edinburgh for his tireless fieldwork and detailed publications, and in 1983 he received an Honorary D.Sc. from the University of Aberdeen.

Bibliography
Books authored or co-authored by Nethersole-Thompson include:
 1951 – The Greenshank (New Naturalist Monograph no.5), London: Collins 
 1966 – The Snow Bunting, Edinburgh: Oliver & Boyd
 1971 – Highland Birds (Highland Life series), Highlands and Islands Development Board; London
 1974 – The Cairngorms: their natural history and scenery, London: Collins
 1975 – Pine Crossbills: a Scottish Contribution, Berkhamsted: Poyser
 1979 – Greenshanks (with Maimie Nethersole-Thompson), Berkhamsted: Poyser
 1986 – Waders, their breeding, haunts and watchers (with Maimie Nethersole-Thompson), Berkhamsted: Poyser
 1988 – The Oystercatcher (Shire Natural History), Shire Publications
 1992 – In Search of Breeding Birds, Leeds: Peregrine Books
 2002 – Tundra Plovers: the Eurasian, Pacific and American Golden Plovers, and Grey Plover (with Ingvar Byrkjedal and Des Thompson), Berkhamsted: Poyser

References

 Highland Naturalists Biographies – Desmond Nethersole-Thompson Accessed 16 October 2007

1908 births
1989 deaths
Scottish ornithologists
Scottish non-fiction writers
New Naturalist writers
20th-century British zoologists
People educated at St Paul's School, London
Alumni of the London School of Economics
Labour Party (UK) parliamentary candidates
Labour Party (UK) councillors
Members of Inverness County Council